Gnathitis is jaw inflammation.

References

External links 

Inflammations
Jaw disorders